Sour Cream was a Dutch recorder trio.

The group was formed by Frans Brüggen in 1972 and consisted of Brüggen, Kees Boeke and Walter van Hauwe with the intent to perform avant-garde work for the recorder.  They were involved in the Dutch counterculture movement, which resulted in some unusual performances: The concluding piece of one of their Boston concerts featured a Keystone Kops-style chase around the stage. A year or two later, with the ensemble playing Telemann trios again in Boston, Brüggen wandered on to the stage, donned a pair of dark sunglasses, stretched himself out on a chaise longue and proceeded to read the newspaper.

Discography
Henry VIII & La Musica Speculativa LP 1980 (reissued DHM)
 The Passion of Reason made as a reunion in June 1993 (reissued Glossa 2016).

References

Further reading
Arlen, Walter. 1979. "Recorder Trio: Sour Cream on Royce Hall Stage". Los Angeles Times (27 October): C11.
Ericson, Raymond. 1978. "Virtuoso on Recorder". New York Times (7 April): C13.
Gelles, George. 1975. "Breathing Live into the Recorder". New York Times (12 October): 167.
Hume, Paul. 1973. "Cream of the Concert: Jamming with Blue Jeans, Woodwinds, New Musical Roles". Washington Post (15 January): B1.
Rosenberg, Deena. 1975. "Sour Cream Curdles the Stereotype". Los Angeles Times (30 March): 52.

Musical groups established in 1969
Dutch recorder players
Instrumental early music groups
Dutch musical trios
Early music groups